Nine to Get Ready is an album by the jazz saxophonist and composer Roscoe Mitchell, recorded in 1997 and released on the ECM label.

Reception
The AllMusic review by Scott Yanow stated: "The performances are mostly concise, emphasize ensembles (it is difficult to believe that the two rhythm sections are playing simultaneously) and are sometimes surprisingly mellow although there are intense moments. None of the original pieces are that memorable but the overall mood is haunting and at times jubilant. An intriguing addition to Roscoe Mitchell's discography".

Track listing
All compositions by Roscoe Mitchell
 "Leola" - 9:35   
 "Dream and Response" - 5:04   
 "For Lester B" - 6:08   
 "Jamaican Farewell" - 5:43   
 "Hop Hip Bip Bir Rip" - 6:02   
 "Nine to Get Ready" - 3:53   
 "Bessie Harris" - 6:44   
 "Fallen Heroes" - 6:37   
 "Move Toward the Light" - 3:21   
 "Big Red Peaches" - 2:05  
Recorded at Avatar Studios in New York City in May 1997

Personnel
Roscoe Mitchell - soprano saxophone, alto saxophone, tenor saxophone, flute, vocals
Hugh Ragin - trumpet
George Lewis - trombone
Matthew Shipp, Craig Taborn - piano
Jaribu Shahid - bass, vocals
William Parker - bass
Gerald Cleaver - drums 
Tani Tabbal - drums, percussion, vocal

References

ECM Records albums
Roscoe Mitchell albums
1999 albums
Albums produced by Manfred Eicher